The Women's 1 km Time Trial B track cycling event at the 2016 Summer Paralympics took place on September 10. This class was for blind and visually impaired cyclists riding with a sighted pilot. Fourteen pairs from 10 different nations competed.

Results

References

Women's 1 km time trial
Para